Alone with You may refer to:

Music

 "Alone with You" (Brenda Lee song)
 "Alone with You" (Tevin Campbell song)
 "Alone with You" (Texas song)
 "Alone with You" (Jake Owen song)
 Alone with You (Loretta Lynn album)
 "Alone with You", a song by Faron Young
 "Alone with You" (Sunnyboys song)
 "Alone with You", a song from deadmau5's album Random Album Title

Other uses

 "Alone With You", a 2016 romantic-adventure video game developed by Benjamin Rivers, released on the PlayStation 4 and PlayStation Vita